Searles is a surname. Notable people with the surname include:

 Adam Searles (born 1 June 1981), British actor
 Baird Searles (1934–1993), American science fiction author and critic
 Charles Searles (1937–2004), African-American artist
 DeWitt Searles (1920–2021), American Air Force major general
 Edward Francis Searles (1841–1920), American architect
 Harold Searles (1918–2015), pioneer of American psychiatry
 Javon Searles (born 1986), Barbadian cricketer
 John Searles, American author and magazine editor
 A. Langley Searles (1920–2009), American chemist
 Mary Hopkins Searles (1818–1891), one of the wealthiest women in the United States
 Michael Searles (1750–1813), English architect
 Robert L. Searles (1919-2004), American business and politician